Orono Field Aerodrome  is located  southeast of Orono, Ontario, Canada.

References

Registered aerodromes in Ontario
Transport in Clarington
Airports in the Regional Municipality of Durham